San Pedro de Buena Vista is a small town in Bolivia, capital of the province of Charcas in the north of the department of Potosí.

References

Populated places in Potosí Department